HSSP may refer to:

 Homology-derived Secondary Structure of Proteins, a protein database
 Port Sudan Military Airport, ICAO airport code HSSP, an airport in Sudan